Miroslav Vjetrović (born 21 July 1956) is a Serbian former footballer who played as a defender.

Career
Vjetrović played in the lower leagues of Yugoslavia, before moving abroad to Germany at the age of 28. He spent two seasons with Hannover 96 between 1984 and 1986, helping them win promotion to the Bundesliga.

After a career-ending leg injury, Vjetrović worked as a sports journalist for over a decade, reporting for German sports magazine Kicker, among others.

References

External links
 
 

1956 births
Living people
Footballers from Belgrade
Yugoslav footballers
Serbian footballers
Association football defenders
FK Palilulac Beograd players
FK Dinamo Pančevo players
FK FAP players
FK Jedinstvo Ub players
FK Obilić players
Hannover 96 players
2. Bundesliga players
Bundesliga players
Yugoslav expatriate footballers
Expatriate footballers in Germany
Yugoslav expatriate sportspeople in Germany
Yugoslav journalists
Serbian journalists